Indian Summer: The Secret History of the End of an Empire (2007) is a historical book written by British historian Alex von Tunzelmann. The book covers the end of British colonial rule in India and the consequences of the partition of the subcontinent; the book was advertised as "an extra ordinary saga of romance, history, religion, and political intrigue." It was set to be adapted into a film by Joe Wright with Hugh Grant and Cate Blanchett rumoured to be playing the Mountbattens; however, it was later reported that production on the film had been put on hold after budgetary concerns and opposition from the Indian government, reportedly concerned about an alleged affair between Jawaharlal Nehru and the wife of the last Viceroy of India, Edwina Mountbatten.

References 

2007 non-fiction books
21st-century history books
Books about British India
British books
Henry Holt and Company books
History books about India
Partition of India